The State Register of Heritage Places is maintained by the Heritage Council of Western Australia. , 744 places are heritage-listed in the City of Greater Geraldton, of which 86 are on the State Register of Heritage Places.

List
The Western Australian State Register of Heritage Places, lists the following 86 state registered places within the City of Greater Geraldton:

References

Geraldton
 
Geraldton